"Let's Make Love" is a song written by Marv Green, Aimee Mayo, Chris Lindsey and Bill Luther, and recorded by American country music artist Faith Hill and her husband Tim McGraw as a duet.  It was released in 2000 as the third single from Hill's album, Breathe, and is also featured on McGraw's first greatest hits album. The song reached number 6 on Hot Country Songs. An accompanying video was released in black and white, and featured McGraw and Hill in and around Paris.

The song won them a Grammy Award for Best Country Collaboration with Vocals in 2001.

Its b-side, "There Will Come a Day", later charted at number 35 on Hot Country Songs in 2001, based on unsolicited airplay.

Cover
Australian born Irish singer Johnny Logan covered the song as a duet with Natasja Crone. It was released as single and included on his 2001 album, Reach for Me.

The Italian singer Patrizio Buanne covered this song twice for his album Forever Begins Tonight: in English and in a bilingual Spanglish version.

Chart positions
"Let's Make Love" debuted at number 65 on Hot Country Songs dated for November 20, 1999 based on unsolicited airplay. As an album cut, it reached as high as number 52 and spent 20 weeks on the charts before falling off. Upon its release as a single, it re-entered on the May 20, 2000 chart at number 60.

Year-end charts

Parodies
American country music parody artist Cledus T. Judd released a parody of "Let's Make Love" titled "Let's Shoot Dove" on his 2002 album Cledus Envy.

References

2000 singles
1999 songs
Faith Hill songs
Tim McGraw songs
Songs written by Aimee Mayo
Male–female vocal duets
Song recordings produced by Byron Gallimore
Songs written by Marv Green
Songs written by Chris Lindsey
Warner Records Nashville singles
Black-and-white music videos